Show Business  is a 1944 movie musical film starring Eddie Cantor, George Murphy, Joan Davis, Nancy Kelly, and Constance Moore.  The film was directed by Edwin L. Marin and released by RKO Radio Pictures.

Cast
 Eddie Cantor as Eddie Martin
 George Murphy as George Doane
 Joan Davis as Joan Mason
 Nancy Kelly as Nancy Gae
 Constance Moore as Constance Ford
 Don Douglas as Charles Lucas

Reception
The film made a profit of $805,000.

References

External links
 

1944 films
1944 musical films
American black-and-white films
1940s English-language films
Films directed by Edwin L. Marin
Films scored by Leigh Harline
American musical films
1940s American films